Lubo is a male given name. Notable people with this name include:

 Lubo Kirov
 Lubo Kristek (born 1943), Czech artist
 Lubo Ganev, Bulgarian volleyball player
 Lubo Michalik
 Lubo Moravcik (born 1965), Slovakian football player and manager
 Lubo Šatka

See also
 Ljubo Karaman
 Lubomir